Špela Ponomarenko Janić (born 2 October 1981) is a Slovenian sprint canoer who has won three medals in the K-1 200 m event at the ICF Canoe Sprint World Championships with a silver in 2006 and bronze in 2007 and 2013.

Ponomarenko also finished sixth in the K-1 500 m event at the 2008 Summer Olympics in Beijing.

References

External links

1981 births
Canoeists at the 2008 Summer Olympics
Canoeists at the 2012 Summer Olympics
Canoeists at the 2016 Summer Olympics
Living people
Olympic canoeists of Slovenia
Slovenian female canoeists
ICF Canoe Sprint World Championships medalists in kayak
Mediterranean Games gold medalists for Slovenia
Competitors at the 2009 Mediterranean Games
Competitors at the 2013 Mediterranean Games
Sportspeople from Koper
Mediterranean Games medalists in canoeing
Canoeists at the 2015 European Games
European Games competitors for Slovenia
Canoeists at the 2020 Summer Olympics